WORO may refer to:

 WORO (FM), a radio station (92.5 FM) licensed to serve Corozal, Puerto Rico
 WORO-DT, a television station (channel 13) licensed to serve Fajardo, Puerto Rico
 Write Once, Read Occasionally; see